This is a list of notable people to have attended the Australian Midwinter Ball.

2018 Ball

Celebrities 
Sam Neill

Political attendees 
Adam Bandt
Anthony Albanese
Bill Shorten
Josh Frydenburg
Peta Credlin
Scott Morrison 
Tanya Plibersek

2013 Ball

Celebrities 
Buzz Aldrin

Diplomats 
Jeffrey Bleich

Political attendees 
Anthony Albanese
Arthur Sinodinos
Bill Shorten
Bob Carr
Christine Milne
George Brandis
Larissa Waters
Kevin Rudd
Penny Wong
Joe Hockey
Tony Abbott
Wayne Swan

See also 
 Federal Parliamentary Press Gallery
 White House Correspondents' Association
 White House Correspondents Dinner

References 

Dining events
Annual events in Australia
Culture of Canberra